In the United States, owned-and-operated television stations (frequently abbreviated as O&Os) constitute only a portion of their parent television networks' station bodies, due to ownership limits imposed by the Federal Communications Commission (FCC). Currently, the total number of television stations owned by any company (including a television network) can only reach a maximum of 39% of all U.S. households; in the past, the ownership limit was much lower, and was determined by a specific number of television stations rather than basing the limits on total market coverage.

Distribution
At the dawn of the American television industry, each company was only allowed to own a total of five television stations around the country. As such, when the networks launched their television operations, they found it more advantageous to put their five owned-and-operated stations in large media markets that had more households (and therefore, denser populations) on the belief that it would result in higher revenue. In other markets, they opted to run their programming on stations through contractual arrangements, making them affiliates instead.

The five-station limit posed a problem for the DuMont Television Network, the first attempt at a "fourth" television network. Paramount Pictures, which had owned KTLA (channel 5) in Los Angeles and WBKB (channel 4, now WBBM-TV on channel 2) in Chicago, owned a share of the network. However, the FCC declared that Paramount controlled DuMont and thus forbade the network and the studio from acquiring any more stations. This was one of the factors that led to DuMont shutting down in August 1956.

For much of the era from 1958 to 1986, the major network-owned stations were distributed as follows: ABC, CBS and NBC each owned stations in the top three markets (New York City, Los Angeles and Chicago). Between 1958 and 1965, fourth-ranked Philadelphia housed CBS-owned WCAU-TV (channel 10) and NBC-owned WRCV-TV (channel 3, now KYW-TV), a station which NBC had acquired two years earlier through a trade with Westinghouse Broadcasting in return for NBC's television and radio stations in Cleveland. The FCC reversed the trade in 1965 and NBC regained control of the Cleveland television station, which is today known as WKYC. Each network owned stations in other markets where the other networks did not: in addition to Cleveland, these were ABC's KGO-TV (channel 7) in San Francisco and WXYZ-TV (channel 7) in Detroit, NBC's WRC-TV (channel 4) in Washington, D.C., and CBS' KMOX-TV (channel 4, now KMOV) in St. Louis.

As a result of a revision to the FCC's media ownership rules in 1999, a company can now own any number of television stations with a combined market reach of less than 39% of the country, but cannot own two of the four highest-rated stations in any market. Still, O&Os in the United States are primarily found in large markets such as New York City, Los Angeles and Chicago, among others. Despite that, network-owned stations can still be found in smaller markets (for example, KFSN-TV (channel 30) in Fresno, California is an ABC O&O; WOGX (channel 51) in Ocala, Florida, is technically a Fox O&O, but is operated out of the studios of and serves as a semi-satellite of the network's Orlando O&O WOFL).

UHF vs. VHF

Early development
Local television stations in the United States were concentrated on the VHF dial (channels 2–13) in the early days of the industry. However, it soon became apparent that the twelve channels available on the VHF dial would not be sufficient to meet the demands of the growing industry. As a result, in 1952, the FCC opened up a new spectrum of frequencies on the UHF dial (channels 14–83) for terrestrial television. As an incentive for companies to operate UHF stations, the FCC relaxed the ownership limit for a given entity from five to seven stations, provided that no more than five were on the VHF dial.

With this opportunity to expand its roster of O&Os, NBC bought WBUF-TV (channel 17) in Buffalo in 1955 and WKNB-TV (channel 30) in New Britain, Connecticut (near Hartford) in 1957, and changed WKNB's call letters to WNBC-TV (the present-day WNBC in New York City used the WRCA-TV callsign from 1954 to 1960). The network wanted to see if a UHF station could effectively compete against VHF stations, and attempted to make the stations more competitive by investing in significant equipment upgrades. However, WBUF consistently ranked behind its VHF competitors, WGR-TV (channel 2, now WGRZ) and WBEN-TV (channel 4, now WIVB-TV). Similarly, WNBC consistently rated behind VHF competitor WNHC-TV (channel 8, now WTNH); WNBC faced an additional problem as its signal was not strong enough to cover New Haven and western Connecticut (nearly all of Connecticut is part of the Hartford-New Haven market).

By the time the FCC allocated additional VHF stations to Buffalo (WKBW-TV, channel 7) and Hartford (WTIC-TV channel 3, now WFSB), NBC decided that its experiment was a lost cause, and put WBUF and WNBC up for sale. While it found a buyer for WNBC (which retained its NBC affiliation), there were no takers for WBUF, and it went off the air in 1958. NBC then affiliated with WGR-TV, where it remains to this day. NBC donated WBUF's license and some of its equipment to PBS member station WNED-TV, which took over the channel 17 frequency in 1959 (due to a number of transactions, the WBUF-TV license is now held by WNLO and the channel 17 frequency was later held by WBXZ-LD; WNED still holds the virtual channel 17 in the Buffalo market, but has not advertised it since the early 2000s).

Similarly, CBS bought UHF stations WGTH-TV (channel 18) in Hartford and WOKY-TV (channel 19, later on channel 18) in Milwaukee in 1955, and changed their call letters to WHCT-TV and WXIX-TV, respectively. However, CBS' ratings were astonishingly low in those markets. In 1959, CBS decided to move its Hartford and Milwaukee affiliations to VHF stations WTIC-TV and WITI-TV (channel 6) respectively, and sold off what became WHCT (now Univision affiliate WUVN) and WXIX (now CW affiliate WVTV) – ironically, CBS was sent back to the UHF dial in Milwaukee following an affiliation switch in December 1994, which saw WITI becoming a Fox station, while its former CBS affiliation moved to WDJT-TV (channel 58).

1980s and beyond
The underperformance of early UHF O&Os (and UHF stations in general) was primarily attributed to the fact that manufacturers were not required to equip new television sets with UHF tuners until 1964, following the 1961 passage of the All-Channel Receiver Act. While the technical problems which plagued early UHF stations had largely disappeared by the 1980s with the spread of UHF tuners and (in particular) cable television, UHF stations in many television markets continued to be compared unfavorably against their VHF counterparts, often simply by virtue of viewer loyalty. As such, the "Big Three" networks (ABC, NBC, and CBS) were still not inclined to acquire UHF stations as network-owned outlets; however, ABC did keep Fresno's KFSN (which was a CBS affiliate at the time the deal was reached) after the network merged with Capital Cities Communications in 1986, as KFSN was the highest-rated station in a market where all of the full-power television stations were on the UHF band, along with the fact it saw the advantage of having a statewide network to share California news coverage and events with, using the resources of KFSN, KGO-TV, and KABC-TV.

By the time the Fox network launched in October 1986, many of the nation's VHF stations were already affiliated with one of the "Big Three" networks. As a result, Fox had little choice but to affiliate with UHF stations in most markets upon its launch (the few VHF outlets that the network initially affiliated with, a few of which were owned by Fox itself, were in a handful of large and mid-sized markets; however, Fox was forced to align with a UHF outlet in a few markets where it initially approached a VHF independent station for an affiliation offer and was turned down). The network even had UHF O&Os in markets like Chicago (WFLD, channel 32), Houston (KRIV, channel 26), and Dallas (KDAF, channel 33). However, by the time that the National Football League awarded Fox the rights to broadcast games from the National Football Conference in 1993, it became convinced that the network would not be viable without more VHF affiliates. As such, in May 1994, the network arranged a deal with New World Communications, which saw nearly all of that group's stations (most of which were VHF outlets) becoming Fox affiliates. Fox then acquired New World Communications outright in July 1996, and those VHF stations (including one in Dallas) became Fox owned-and-operated stations in the process. The network, however, did acquire more UHF O&Os in subsequent years, including Philadelphia's WTXF-TV (channel 29) in 1995, Orlando's WOFL (channel 35) in 2002, and Charlotte's WJZY (channel 46) in 2013.

As a result of the New World deal, CBS lost its longtime Detroit affiliate WJBK (channel 2) to Fox. CBS then unsuccessfully sought to affiliate with other stations in the market before it eventually purchased low-rated ethnic independent WGPR-TV (channel 62) and changed the station's callsign to WWJ-TV (a callsign once used by one of the stations that CBS approached for an affiliation, WDIV-TV) in 1995. The station continues to receive low ratings, and after a brief attempt at running an 11:00 p.m. newscast from 2001 to 2002 that was produced by sister station WKBD-TV (which voluntarily shut down its news department shortly afterward to enter into a short-lived news share agreement with WXYZ-TV), was the only CBS owned-and-operated station without a local news presence until 2009, when a morning newscast produced by the Detroit Free Press premiered (that program, First Forecast Mornings, was canceled in 2012). CBS also bought KEYE-TV (channel 42) in Austin, Texas from the Granite Broadcasting Corporation in 2000, five years after that station took the CBS affiliation from KTBC, another former New World station that switched to Fox.

NBC would not buy a UHF O&O again until 1995, when it acquired WNCN (channel 17) in Goldsboro, North Carolina (part of the Raleigh–Durham market). It subsequently purchased KNSD (channel 39) in San Diego in 1996, and it repurchased channel 30 in Hartford, now WVIT, in 1997.

Currently, most American networks have at least one owned-and-operated station on a UHF frequency (which now usually corresponds to the station's physical digital channel, particularly in cases where a station previously operated on a VHF channel, which now corresponds to its virtual channel, prior to the 2009 digital television transition). Newer networks, such as Univision and Ion Television, even have mostly UHF O&Os.

Ownership and network changes
Mergers, acquisitions, and other business deals between television networks and other companies sometimes require a network to sell off an O&O, in order to stay under the ownership cap. In addition, networks may choose to sell off O&Os in smaller markets in order to concentrate on their stations in larger markets, or to give themselves leeway to purchase stations in other growing markets. The following are examples of transactions involving owned-and-operated stations in the United States:

DuMont Television Network
The DuMont network found itself in financial trouble in 1954, and decided to sell off its Pittsburgh owned-and-operated station, WDTV (channel 2), which was the only commercial VHF station in what was then a top ten television market in the United States. Westinghouse Electric Corporation bought the station for $6.75 million, and changed its call letters to KDKA-TV (that station now operates as a CBS O&O, as a result of the network's 1995 merger with Westinghouse).

However, even with income generated from the sale, DuMont was never able to recover from its problems, and the network shut down in August 1956. Its two other owned-and-operated stations, WABD (channel 5, now WNYW) in New York City and WTTG (channel 5) in Washington, D.C., became independent stations and remained so until October 1986, when they became Fox O&Os at the network's inception.

CBS
In 1986, CBS sold its longtime owned-and-operated station in St. Louis, KMOX-TV, to Viacom (then a separate entity from CBS, which merged with the network in 2000 before splitting into separate companies six years later; the two would remerge to become ViacomCBS on December 4, 2019; that company was later renamed Paramount Global). Viacom changed the station's callsign to KMOV, then sold it to Belo Corporation in 1997, in a three-way swap that also saw Viacom acquiring KSTW (channel 11) in Seattle–Tacoma from Cox Enterprises, and that company in return getting KIRO-TV (channel 7) from Belo. Belo merged with the Gannett Company in 2013; as a condition of the deal, KMOV was acquired by the Meredith Corporation in 2014. CBS purchased KOVR (channel 13) in Stockton, California from the Sinclair Broadcast Group in May 2005.

On February 7, 2007, CBS announced the sale of its owned-and-operated stations in Salt Lake City (KUTV and its satellite in St. George, Utah, KUSG) and Austin (KEYE-TV) to Four Points Media Group, a holding company owned by Cerberus Capital Management as part of a group deal which also included two CW owned-and-operated stations (WTVX in West Palm Beach and WLWC in Providence), one low-power MyNetworkTV affiliate and one low-power Azteca América affiliate (both located in West Palm Beach). Six days later, CBS announced that it was swapping its O&O in Green Bay, WFRV-TV (channel 5), and its satellite in Escanaba, Michigan, WJMN-TV (channel 3), to Liberty Media in exchange for common CBS stock held by Liberty Media; the sale of WFRV/WJMN closed on April 18, 2007. The Four Points transaction was approved by the FCC on November 21, 2007, and was finalized on January 10, 2008. In 2012, the Four Points stations were acquired by the Sinclair Broadcast Group; WFRV/WJMN was sold to the Nexstar Broadcasting Group in 2011.

NBC
For much of the modern television era, NBC did not have an owned-and-operated station in Philadelphia. In 1955, NBC forced Westinghouse to trade its NBC-affiliated Philadelphia cluster of KYW-AM (1060) and WPTZ-TV (channel 3) to NBC in exchange for WTAM-AM-FM and WNBK-TV in Cleveland. Westinghouse only agreed to the trade after NBC threatened not only to yank its programming from WPTZ, but also Westinghouse-owned WBZ-TV (channel 4) in Boston. NBC changed the callsigns of the Philadelphia stations to WRCV-AM-TV, while Westinghouse changed the Cleveland stations' callsigns to KYW-AM-FM-TV. NBC's then-ownership of Philadelphia's channel 3 was cited by CBS when it purchased its then-affiliate WCAU-TV in 1958, despite FCC rules at the time barring companies from owning stations with overlapping signals, as WRCA/WRCV did.

In 1965, NBC was forced to reverse the trade on orders from the Federal Communications Commission and the United States Department of Justice. WRCV-TV's callsign was then changed to KYW-TV to match its radio cousin. When NBC regained control of the Cleveland stations, it changed their callsigns to WKYC-AM-FM-TV, because of the AM station's popularity as "KY11". It sold the radio stations in 1972, but kept WKYC-TV until 1990, when majority control of the station was sold to Multimedia, Inc. (which later merged with the Gannett Company in 1995); NBC remained minority owner of WKYC-TV until 1999 when it sold its remaining interest to Gannett. NBC continued to pursue efforts to acquire an owned-and-operated station in Philadelphia, especially when KYW became its weakest major-market affiliate for much of the 1980s. However, NBC was unsuccessful until 1995, when it won a bidding war for longtime CBS O&O WCAU-TV.

In 1997, LIN TV Corporation sold a 76% stake in Dallas-Fort Worth's KXAS-TV (channel 5) to NBC in exchange for 24% of San Diego's KNSD; therefore, NBC owned 76% of both stations. Although this was not defined as a traditional O&O arrangement, NBC's controlling interest in the stations allowed them to be considered NBC owned-and-operated stations. In February 2013, LIN pulled out of the joint venture, giving NBC 100% ownership of the two stations.

In December 2001, NBC acquired an O&O in the San Francisco Bay Area, when it purchased San Jose-based KNTV (channel 11) from the Granite Broadcasting Corporation; the sale to NBC was finalized in April 2002. Prior to the purchase, KNTV had been affiliated with ABC for most of its history, while NBC was affiliated with KRON-TV (channel 4); by 2000, ABC wished for its own longtime San Francisco O&O station, KGO-TV, to exclusively serve the San Jose portion of the market and terminated its 40-year affiliation with KNTV; while KRON, which had recently been sold to Young Broadcasting, opted to end its NBC affiliation after 52 years in the wake of a dispute with NBC (which lost a bidding war for the station to Young as KRON's longtime owners, the Chronicle Publishing Company, sold off its media properties) over the terms of the renewing the station's affiliation contract. Granite, which had been operating KNTV as a WB affiliate since it ended its affiliation with ABC, offered to pay NBC a then unheard-of annual payment of $37 million for the station to become an NBC affiliate, an offer which NBC accepted before later finalizing the outright acquisition (back in 1960, ABC allowed KNTV to be its affiliate because it agreed to not serve San Jose directly, but focus more on the Monterey Bay area, which was too far south to receive KGO's over-the-air signal clearly; KNTV also agreed to transmit at a lower power so as not to unreasonably overlap with KGO's signal; upon the July 2000 termination of the affiliation agreement, ABC added KGO to cable systems in the Salinas-Monterey area to compensate for the loss of ABC programming on KNTV, a situation that continued until the summer of 2011, when the area's NBC affiliate, Hearst Television-owned KSBW-TV (channel 8), relaunched its second digital subchannel to serve as a separate ABC affiliate for the area).

On March 19, 2008, NBC announced its intention to sell two additional O&Os: WTVJ in Miami and WVIT in New Britain-Hartford, Connecticut. On July 18 of that year, it was announced that WTVJ would be sold to Post-Newsweek Stations (now the Graham Media Group), then owner of Miami's ABC affiliate WPLG (channel 10). Had the FCC approved this deal, it would have resulted in the Miami market being home to the largest duopoly in the United States between two "Big Three" or "Big Four" network affiliates. WVIT was later withdrawn from the selling block, as all of the offers made for that station were much lower than NBC's asking price. The sale of WTVJ also fell through due to the delay in FCC approval for the deal, the election of Barack Obama as president effectively de facto signaling a rejection of the deal from a Democratic-led FCC board of commissioners was coming, and public opposition over the proposed sale of WTVJ to the owner of another major network station.

In 2016, NBC announced that it would launch a new O&O in Boston (WBTS-LD) on January 1, 2017, replacing WHDH-TV as the network's Boston affiliate.

ABC
Detroit's WXYZ-TV had been an ABC owned-and-operated station from its sign-on in 1948, as WXYZ radio (1270 AM, now WXYT) had been an affiliate of ABC radio's predecessor, the NBC Blue Network. However, when Capital Cities Communications acquired ABC in 1985, the combined assets of the new company exceeded the FCC's ownership limit at the time. As such, the network opted to sell WXYZ to the E. W. Scripps Company, having remained with ABC ever since then as an affiliate of the network.

During the series of network affiliation switches that was spurred by Fox's 1994 deal with New World Communications, ABC bought two stations in markets adjacent to Detroit: WTVG (channel 13) in Toledo, Ohio and WJRT (channel 12) in Flint, Michigan – specifically in order to keep some fringe suburban coverage of its programming in the Detroit market, in the event that Scripps would attempt to affiliate WXYZ-TV with another network, resulting in a possible move of ABC to a lower-tier station in the market. Though WXYZ stayed with ABC after Scripps agreed to keep that station affiliated with the network in exchange for affiliation deals with stations that the company owned in other cities, ABC decided to retain ownership of WTVG and WJRT.

Capital Cities also owned two CBS affiliates – Fresno's KFSN and Raleigh-Durham's WTVD (channel 11) – and chose to switch them both to ABC. CBS programming moved to former ABC affiliates in the two markets, WRAL-TV (channel 5) in Raleigh-Durham and KGPE (channel 47) in Fresno; WRAL was one of CBS's strongest affiliates until it switched to NBC in 2016, instead becoming one of NBC's strongest affiliates.

On November 3, 2010, ABC reached an agreement to sell WJRT and WTVG back to former owner SJL Broadcasting, amidst speculation that The Walt Disney Company might spin off ABC; both stations retained their ABC affiliations (SJL then flipped the stations to Gray Television, at a significant profit, in July 2014). When the sale was completed, KFSN in Fresno (at the time ranked as the 55th largest media market) would then become the smallest English-language owned-and-operated major network station by market size (not counting satellites and semi-satellites). The sale was completed on April 1, 2011. The Disney spin-off of ABC has never occurred, mainly due to insider trading allegations that scuttled the deal.

Fox
In 1987, Fox purchased its Boston affiliate, WFXT (channel 25). The network's then-parent company News Corporation (whose entertainment properties largely became part of the restructured 21st Century Fox through its July 2013 spin-off of its publishing division) also owned The Boston Herald, requiring Fox to obtain a temporary cross-ownership waiver for the station. When the waiver to retain ownership of both the newspaper and television station expired, WFXT was sold to the Boston Celtics of the National Basketball Association (NBA). The Celtics could not survive as a broadcaster, and Fox purchased WFXT a second time in 1995 after the Herald was sold.

As a result of the aforementioned Fox/New World partnership, Fox had to sell off its original O&Os in Dallas (KDAF) and Atlanta (WATL, channel 36), respectively selling them to Renaissance Broadcasting and Qwest Broadcasting. KDFW (channel 4) and WAGA-TV (channel 5) became Fox owned-and-operated stations in the respective markets after Fox Television Stations merged with New World Communications (KDAF is now a CW affiliate owned by Tribune Broadcasting, which ironically acquired both Qwest and Renaissance during the late 1990s, and held a partial ownership stake in Qwest; WATL, also a former WB affiliate, is now a MyNetworkTV affiliate owned by Tegna).

On June 13, 2007, Fox announced its intention to sell nine of its owned-and-operated stations: WJW (channel 8) in Cleveland, Ohio; KDVR (channel 31) in Denver, Colorado; KTVI (channel 2) in St. Louis, Missouri; WDAF-TV (channel 4) in Kansas City, Missouri; WITI in Milwaukee, Wisconsin; KSTU (channel 13) in Salt Lake City, Utah; WHBQ-TV (channel 13) in Memphis, Tennessee; WBRC (channel 6) in Birmingham, Alabama and WGHP (channel 8) in Greensboro, North Carolina. On December 21 of that year, it was announced that eight of the stations – WHBQ being the only one not included – would be sold to Local TV, a broadcast holding company controlled by the private equity firm Oak Hill Capital Partners; the sale closed on July 14, 2008.

Of the eight former Fox O&Os involved in the sale to Local TV, WBRC ended up being traded to Raycom Media on March 31, 2009, in exchange for Richmond, Virginia CBS affiliate WTVR-TV (channel 6); WBRC was subsequently acquired by Gray Television as part of its merger with Raycom, which was completed on January 2, 2019. WHBQ was later withdrawn from the selling block after Fox failed to find a suitable buyer for the station, as both Local TV and Raycom both already owned stations in that market (WREG (channel 3) and WMC-TV (channel 5), respectively) which would easily put them over the FCC's market ownership caps, and the only other buyer that might have been interested – Newport Television – already owned two stations in Memphis at the time: WPTY-TV (channel 24, now WATN-TV) and WLMT (channel 30). The remaining seven former Fox O&Os were acquired by Tribune Broadcasting as part of its purchase of Local TV, an acquisition that closed on December 27, 2013. Sinclair Broadcast Group would announce its acquisition of Tribune in 2017, which would have seen Fox reacquire WJW, KSTU, and KDVR and acquire WSFL-TV (channel 39) in Miami, KSWB-TV (channel 69) in San Diego, KTXL (channel 40) in Sacramento, and KCPQ-TV (channel 13) in Seattle, which all would have become owned-and-operated stations of the network; however, Tribune terminated the deal in August 2018.

On June 24, 2014, Fox announced that it would trade WFXT and WHBQ to the Cox Media Group, in exchange for the San Francisco duopoly of Fox affiliate KTVU (channel 2) and independent station KICU-TV (channel 36), which Fox had sought to acquire for several years (in this instance, it was part of an attempt by the network to acquire O&Os in additional markets where a franchise in the National Football Conference, from which most of Fox's NFL game telecasts come, is based). The trade was completed on October 8, 2014.

In December 2018, Nexstar Media Group announced its acquisition of Tribune. As was the case with Sinclair's failed acquisition of the company, Fox sought to buy certain Fox-affiliated stations owned by Tribune, with KDVR, KCPQ, and WJW emerging as potential candidates. However, in March 2019, Nexstar announced that KSTU and WSFL-TV would be acquired by the E.W. Scripps Company; Nexstar intended to retain KSWB, KTXL, WJW, KCPQ, and KDVR after the transaction is completed. Two months after the close of the Nexstar deal, Fox Television Stations and Nexstar announced a swap, where Fox would acquire KCPQ and KZJO in Seattle, along with a re-acquisition of WITI in Milwaukee, with Nexstar acquiring Fox's Charlotte, North Carolina duopoly of WJZY and WMYT-TV.

The WB
From January 1995 to September 2006, Time Warner and Tribune Broadcasting jointly owned The WB Television Network. Tribune initially held a 12.5% ownership interest in the network at its launch, a stake that it later increased to 22%. As a result of its partnership, in November 1993 (fourteen months before the network debuted), Tribune agreed to a deal to affiliate most of its independent stations with The WB. Despite Tribune's minority stake, the company's stations were not considered to be WB owned-and-operated-stations due to Time Warner's controlling interest in the network. This resulted in The WB having the unusual distinction of being the only broadcast network that did not have O&Os in New York City, Los Angeles and Chicago throughout its existence (the three Tribune-owned WB affiliates in those cities – WPIX, KTLA and WGN-TV, respectively – were affiliates of the network as a result).

However, Tribune was the only one of the two companies involved in The WB that owned any stations aligned with the network as Time Warner did not own any television stations at the network's launch and would not own one until its 1996 merger with the Turner Broadcasting System, owners of Atlanta superstation WTBS (channel 17, now WPCH-TV; its national feed, TBS, is now a separate basic cable channel). On January 24, 2006, Time Warner and CBS Corporation announced that they would merge The WB with the CBS-owned United Paramount Network to form a new broadcast network called The CW. All except three of Tribune's 19 WB stations joined The CW when it launched on September 18, 2006, through ten-year affiliation agreements (although two – KSWB-TV (channel 69, now a Fox affiliate) in San Diego and WTTV (channel 4, now a CBS affiliate) in Indianapolis – have since disaffiliated from the network under Tribune ownership, while another – WLVI (channel 56) in Boston, which remains with The CW – was sold by Tribune to Sunbeam Television in September 2006). Tribune, however, does not have an ownership interest in The CW, having opted to forego a stake in the network in order to avoid having to finance shutdown costs for The WB.

ACME Communications, which operated WB-affiliated stations in small and mid-sized markets, was owned by Jamie Kellner, the network's president from its 1995 launch until 2001. However, neither Time Warner or Tribune considered the ACME stations on the same level as the Tribune stations, nor did Time Warner have any interest in the stations outside of traditional affiliation agreements, or vice versa did ACME have any interest in Time Warner. Despite this, the ACME stations were among the first awarded de facto affiliation agreements for The CW when the network began to open up affiliation negotiations in March 2006, as many of its stations were among the top affiliates of The WB by viewership.

UPN
UPN stations that were formerly owned by Chris-Craft Industries and those that were owned by CBS Corporation at the end of the network's run were sometimes considered owned-and-operated stations of the network, and several transactions have involved these stations. Not too long after becoming a UPN owned-and-operated station itself, San Antonio station KRRT (channel 35, now KMYS) was sold to Jet Broadcasting in 1995, eventually becoming an affiliate of The WB (the station is now a CW affiliate that is operated by former owner Sinclair Broadcast Group, and owned by Sinclair partner company Deerfield Media).

On August 12, 2000, Chris-Craft sold its UPN stations to the Fox Television Stations subsidiary of News Corporation for $5.5 billion – these stations had been stripped of their status as UPN owned-and-operated stations earlier that year due to Viacom's buyout of Chris-Craft's stake in the network, but remained with UPN as affiliates. Of those stations, San Francisco's KBHK (channel 44, now KBCW) was traded to the Paramount Stations Group, while Portland's KPTV (channel 12) was traded to the Meredith Corporation. Both KPTV and former Minneapolis-St. Paul sister station KMSP-TV (channel 9) traded their UPN affiliations with Fox affiliates in those markets that they respectively became co-owned with, WFTC (channel 29) and KPDX (channel 49). Fox had acquired WFTC from Clear Channel Communications not long after the Chris-Craft purchase was finalized, while Meredith already owned KPDX at the time it purchased KPTV. The other UPN stations that remained under Fox ownership retained their affiliations with that network, but were no longer O&Os – giving UPN the distinction of being one of only two broadcast networks whose stations in the three largest markets of New York, Los Angeles and Chicago were not owned-and-operated stations (along with The WB); WWOR-TV (channel 9) in Secaucus, New Jersey (part of the New York City market) and KCOP-TV (channel 13) in Los Angeles were de facto O&Os prior to Viacom's buyout of Chris-Craft's stake in UPN, while WPWR-TV (channel 50) in Chicago was an affiliate of UPN throughout the network's run (and would not be co-owned with the two other larger-market stations until after Fox purchased it from Newsweb Corporation in 2002).

In September 2006, these stations became O&Os of MyNetworkTV, which was created in response to The CW's decision to affiliate stations owned by Tribune Broadcasting and network part-owner CBS Corporation's CBS Television Stations subsidiary with the network instead of Fox's UPN-affiliated stations. In fact, two of the former Chris-Craft stations have the distinction of being owned-and-operated stations of two networks: WWOR-TV (the second in the New York City market after sister station WNYW, which has been an O&O of DuMont and Fox), and KCOP-TV (the first and only station in the Los Angeles market), both having been O&Os of UPN and MyNetworkTV.

Viacom/CBS sold off several UPN owned-and-operated stations during the network's final five years. Mercury Broadcasting bought Wichita, Kansas' KSCC (channel 36, now KMTW) in 2001 (the station is now owned by Deerfield Media under a local marketing agreement with Sinclair Broadcast Group); KTXH (channel 20) in Houston and WDCA (channel 20) in Washington, D.C. were sold to Fox Television Stations that same year (as part of the aforementioned swap with KBHK, both are now owned-and-operated stations of MyNetworkTV). In 2005, WNDY-TV (channel 23) in Indianapolis and WWHO (channel 53) in Columbus were sold to LIN TV; in 2006, KAUT-TV (channel 43) in Oklahoma City was sold to The New York Times Company (which later sold its entire television group to Local TV, which in turn was subsequently acquired by Tribune Broadcasting), and in 2008, WUPL (channel 54) in New Orleans was sold to Belo (which subsequently merged with the Gannett Company).

The CW
Because of CBS Corporation's and later Paramount Global's ownership stake in The CW Television Network, while not a traditional O&O arrangement, stations owned by the company that carry programming from the network were previously considered O&Os. In February 2007, as part of the aforementioned group deal that included two of CBS's O&Os, CBS Corporation sold its CW owned-and-operated stations in West Palm Beach, Florida (WTVX, channel 34) and Providence (WLWC, channel 28) to Four Points Media Group. The Four Points stations were subsequently acquired by the Sinclair Broadcast Group; WLWC, in turn, has since been spun off to OTA Broadcasting, LLC.

In June 2010, CBS announced the sale of its Norfolk, Virginia CW O&O WGNT (channel 27) to Local TV, then owner of that market's CBS affiliate WTKR-TV (channel 3) (as well as seven former Fox O&O stations). This created the second television duopoly in that market (the first involved LIN TV-owned NBC affiliate WAVY-TV (channel 10) and Fox affiliate WVBT (channel 43)). As part of the deal, Local TV would take over the operations of WGNT through a time brokerage agreement while the deal awaited FCC approval. Until the sale closed on August 4, WGNT was the smallest station by market size to be owned by CBS following the Four Points Media Group deal. The sale of WGNT also made WJZ-TV (channel 13) in Baltimore the smallest station by market size that is still owned by CBS (WGNT, along with WTKR, is now owned by The E. W. Scripps Company).

In October 2022, Nexstar Media Group purchased a majority stake in The CW from Paramount Global and Warner Bros. Discovery. Nexstar had previously acquired Tribune Media, and with it CW affiliates in major markets such as Los Angeles, Dallas, and Washington, D.C. As such, those stations and other existing Nexstar-owned CW affiliates effectively became CW O&Os. This includes several stations that run the network on a digital subchannel, including those receiving programming from small-market feed The CW Plus, but not stations owned by other entities such as Mission Broadcasting, which bought WPIX in New York City after buying it from the E. W. Scripps Company (Nexstar had divested the station to Scripps as part of the Tribune deal due to FCC ownership regulations), which Nexstar provides services to through local marketing agreements.

Other networks
In 1999, not long after Ion Television launched as Pax TV, its parent company Paxson Communications (now Ion Media Networks) sold its Dayton, Green Bay and Decatur O&Os – WDPX (channel 26), WPXG (channel 14) and WPXU (channel 23), respectively – to ACME Communications; the stations later changed their respective callsigns to WBDT, WCWF and WBUI. All three stations then became primary affiliates of The WB (though they retained secondary affiliations with Pax until 2005); the stations are now CW affiliates (WBDT and WCWF were sold to LIN TV, while WBUI was sold to GOCOM Media).

Two years later, in 2001, Pax sold its Little Rock owned-and-operated station KYPX (channel 42) to Equity Broadcasting, which switched the station's affiliation to The WB as KWBF (that station is now MyNetworkTV affiliate KARZ-TV, owned by the Nexstar Media Group). In 2003, Pax sold its Albuquerque, New Mexico O&O, KAPX (channel 14, now KTFQ-TV), to Univision Communications, which turned it into an O&O of TeleFutura. That same year, Paxson sold KPXJ (channel 21) in Shreveport, Louisiana, to KTBS, Inc. (owner of the station's ABC-affiliated sister station KTBS-TV); that station became a UPN affiliate and is also now an affiliate of The CW.

Multiple networks
Philadelphia's WCAU-TV had been a CBS owned-and-operated station starting in 1958. However, after CBS announced its alliance with Westinghouse Broadcasting in 1995, the network chose to affiliate with Westinghouse's KYW-TV, Philadelphia's longtime NBC affiliate. After a bidding war, WCAU was sold to NBC. KYW became a CBS owned-and-operated station after Westinghouse's merger with CBS a few months later.

As part of the same deal, NBC in turn transferred its own O&O stations in Denver (KCNC-TV, channel 4) and Salt Lake City (KUTV) to Westinghouse/CBS, and those stations became CBS O&Os after Westinghouse merged with CBS. NBC and CBS also swapped transmitting facilities in Miami between the then-weaker CBS-owned WCIX (channel 6, now WFOR-TV, channel 4) and the then-stronger NBC-owned WTVJ (channel 4, now on the weaker channel 6 signal under the same calls).

Stations that have been O&Os of more than one major network
This includes future O&Os, and also counts stations aligned with UPN, The WB and The CW.

O&O stations of U.S. broadcast television networks

ABC

Current owned-and-operated stations

Former owned-and-operated stations

CBS

Current owned-and-operated stations

Former owned-and-operated stations

The CW

Current owned-and-operated stations

Former owned-and-operated stations

Estrella TV

Current owned-and-operated stations

Former owned-and-operated station

Fox

Current owned-and-operated stations

Former owned-and-operated stations

Ion Television
Note: Some stations were owned by Ion Media Networks under its former name Paxson Communications prior to the 1998 launch of Ion Television as Pax TV.

Current owned-and-operated stations

Former owned-and-operated stations

MyNetworkTV

Current owned-and-operated stations

Former owned-and-operated stations

NBC

Current owned-and-operated stations

Former owned-and-operated stations

Telemundo

Current owned-and-operated stations

Former owned-and-operated station

Trinity Broadcasting Network
Notes:
1) Stations indicated by two plus signs ("++") are stations that were signed on by TBN or a TBN subsidiary.
2) Stations indicated by two asterisks ("**") represent a station owned by Community Educational Television, a TBN subsidiary.

Current owned-and-operated stations

Former owned-and-operated stations

Until 2018, TBN never sold any of its full-power television stations (either one it owns outright or through its Community Educational Television subsidiary), though several translator stations have been sold off since the digital transition to other parties for either spectrum speculation, to become translators of other commercial stations, or in the case of W41BN in Dothan, Alabama, to become an affiliate of one of the major broadcast networks; in that case W41BN is now WRGX-LD, the market's NBC affiliate under the ownership of Gray Television. Several other translator stations have been taken off-the-air completely as TBN's distribution has become concentrated on pay television and IPTV distribution, due to the prohibitive costs of upgrading the entire network's translator system to digital.

In September 2018, TBN completed the sale of full-power station WDLI-TV to Ion Media, with whom it had entered into a channel sharing agreement in March 2018 involving Ion's WVPX-TV; Ion chose to exploit WDLI-TV's full-market cable and satellite coverage for carriage of Ion Life/Plus in Cleveland, formerly carried on WVPX-DT3. The same transaction resulted in the sale of WKOI-TV to Ion Media which allowed dual-market carriage of Ion Television in Dayton and Cincinnati after TBN entered into a channel sharing agreement with WDTN, WSFJ-TV's channel share with Daystar's WCLL-CD resulted in full-market coverage of Ion Plus in the Columbus market, and the same arrangement with Ion's WIPX-TV resulted in WCLJ becoming a primary Ion Plus station for the Indianapolis market.

UniMás

Current owned-and-operated stations

Univision

Current owned-and-operated stations

O&O stations of defunct major television networks in the United States

DuMont Television Network

UPN
UPN was co-founded by United Television / Chris-Craft Television and Paramount Pictures, and launched on January 16, 1995.

Notes

References

External links 
 ABC-owned Television Stations – List of ABC O&Os
 CBS Television Stations – List of CBS and CW O&Os
 NBC-owned Television Stations – List of NBC and Telemundo O&Os
 Fox Television Stations – List of Fox and MyNetwork TV O&Os

 
American television-related lists